The 1911–12 Cornell Big Red men's ice hockey season was the 11th season of play for the program.

Season
With the team losing seven of the nine players from last year's championship team due to graduation, Cornell had difficult in sustaining a high level of play. The offense was particularly anemic, failing to score more than one goal in half of their games.

The team was also faced with the disadvantage of not being able to play at home. Warm weather forced the Big Red to play all of their games away from Ithaca, though most were neutral-site games in Syracuse. Even with all of the difficulties, Cornell did not play terribly. Most of their losses were close affairs and the ice time gave the new players valuable experience for the following season. The biggest loss for the team was when head coach Talbot Hunter resigned after the season.

Roster

Standings

Schedule and Results

|-
!colspan=12 style=";" | Regular Season

References

Cornell Big Red men's ice hockey seasons
Cornell
Cornell
Cornell
Cornell